Wath Athletic F.C. was an English football club based in Wath-upon-Dearne, South Yorkshire.

History
The club was formed as Wath F.C. in the late 1880s, entering the Hallamshire League in 1891. They played in local Sheffield leagues and entered the FA Cup for the first time in 1893 (as Wath-upon-Dearne), before changing their name to Wath Athletic in 1899. This name change reflected their move to the new Athletic Ground in the village.

In 1904 the club became defunct, but returned again three years later and rejoined the Sheffield Association League, winning the league title at the first time of asking in 1908. They won the Association League on a further three occasions before the First World War, and when hostilities ended Wath joined the Yorkshire League, though only for the 1920–21 season.

In the summer of 1921 Athletic were admitted into the Midland League, and they would spend a total of nine seasons in the competition. Although their highest league finish (fourth) came in 1926–27, they had arguably their most successful season a year earlier when they reached the 1st Round of the FA Cup for the only time, losing 0–5 to Chesterfield, before winning the Sheffield & Hallamshire Senior Cup for the first time after losing the final in 1897.

They left the Midland League in 1930 after finishing bottom of the 26 team table, returning to the Association League. They won the Association League again in 1932 but the club fell on hard times and disbanded before the outbreak of the Second World War.

Notable former players
Players that have played in the Football League either before or after playing for Wath Athletic –

 John Addenbrooke
 Jack Angus
 Eric Brook
 Walter Moore
 Albert Pape
 Bernard Radford
 Pip Rippon
 Harold Watson
 Jack Wilkinson

League and cup history

Honours

League
Sheffield Association League
Champions (5): 1907–08, 1910–11, 1911–12, 1912–13, 1931–32

Cup
Sheffield & Hallamshire Senior Cup
Winners: 1925–26
Runners-up: 1896–97

Records
Best league performance, 4th, Midland League, 1926–27
Best FA Cup performance: 1st Round, 1925–26

References

Defunct football clubs in England
Defunct football clubs in South Yorkshire
Sheffield & District Football League
Sheffield Association League
Yorkshire Football League
Midland Football League (1889)